Siekierczyn  is a village in Lubań County, Lower Silesian Voivodeship, in south-western Poland. It is the seat of the administrative district (gmina) called Gmina Siekierczyn.

As at 2006 the village has an approximate population of 1,800.

References

Siekierczyn